Göksu Park is a public park in Ankara, Turkey. Göksu Park is in Eryaman, a neighbourhood in the district of Etimesgut in Ankara. It was an unneglected lake until 2003. In 2003, the lake was taken care of by the Municipality of Ankara and Municipality of Etimesgut and the park was opened that same year.

Galery 

Parks in Ankara
Urban public parks
2003 establishments in Turkey